Troms og Finnmark County Municipality (or ) is the regional governing administration of Troms og Finnmark county in northern Norway. It has its administration in the city of Tromsø.  It consists of a 57-member county council and a 5-member county cabinet.

County government
The Troms og Finnmark county council is made up of 57 representatives that are elected every four years. The council essentially acts as a Parliament or legislative body for the county. The council is led by a county mayor, and the council elects five members to be in the county cabinet which carries out the executive functions of the county.

County council
The party breakdown of the council is as follows:

References

County Municipality
County municipalities of Norway
Organisations based in Tromsø
2020 establishments in Norway